Hassman is an unincorporated community in Morrison Township, Aitkin County, Minnesota, United States. The community is located near the junction of U.S. Highway 169 and State Highway 210 (MN 210), north of Aitkin. The Mississippi River and the Rice River both flow nearby.

References

Unincorporated communities in Aitkin County, Minnesota
Unincorporated communities in Minnesota